Touching the Void may refer to:

 Touching the Void (book), a 1988 book by Joe Simpson
 Touching the Void (film), a 2003 film based on the book
 Touching the Void (play), a 2018 play based on the book